The 1993–94 Sussex County Football League season was the 69th in the history of Sussex County Football League a football competition in England.

Division One

Division One featured 17 clubs which competed in the division last season, along with three new clubs, promoted from Division Two:
Crowborough Athletic
East Grinstead
Stamco

League table

Division Two

Division Two featured 14 clubs which competed in the division last season, along with four new clubs:
Midhurst & Easebourne, relegated from Division One
Steyning Town, joined from the Combined Counties League 
Storrington, promoted from Division Three
Withdean, promoted from Division Three

League table

Division Three

Division Three featured eleven clubs which competed in the division last season, along with five new clubs:
Edwards Sports
Haywards Heath Town, relegated from Division Two
Lingfield, joined from the Mid-Sussex League
Seaford Town, relegated from Division Two
Sunallon

League table

References

1993-94
1993–94 in English football leagues